KTHE was an AM radio station licensed to Thermopolis, Wyoming and broadcasting at 1240 kHz. The station broadcast an adult standards format. It signed on in August 1955. The tower for KTHE was located near the mouth of Wind River Canyon. It was previously located just outside Hot Springs State Park next to its former studios. The  studios were relocated to 420 Arapahoe Street in Thermopolis. The station's license was surrendered for cancellation to the Federal Communications Commission (FCC) on September 3, 2014, and the FCC cancelled the license on September 8, 2014, leaving no locally licensed AM stations in Thermopolis. Edwards Communications had originally planned to develop KTHE however those plans did not go through.

Signal
KTHE broadcast a 1,000 watt signal day and night. During the day, KTHE could be heard as far south as Lander, and as far east as Casper. KTHE could be received as far north as Greybull.

References

THE
Adult standards radio stations in the United States
Radio stations established in 1955
Defunct radio stations in the United States
Radio stations disestablished in 2014
1955 establishments in Wyoming
2014 disestablishments in Wyoming
THE
Hot Springs County, Wyoming